This following is a list of articles listing nuclear reactors.

By use 
 List of commercial nuclear reactors
 List of inactive or decommissioned civil nuclear reactors
 List of nuclear research reactors
 List of nuclear power stations
 List of nuclear submarines – nuclear-powered subs with nuclear reactors
 List of sunken nuclear submarines
 List of nuclear-powered aircraft

By type 
 List of reactor types
 List of small modular reactor designs
 List of fusor examples – fusor-type nuclear fusion reactors
 List of fusion experiments

By location 
 List of nuclear power plants in Japan
 List of Russian small nuclear reactors
 List of cancelled nuclear reactors in Russia
 List of United States Naval reactors
 List of cancelled nuclear reactors in the United States
 List of the largest nuclear power stations in the United States
 List of nuclear power systems in space

See also 
 List of power stations

List
Nuclear reactors
Nuclear reactors